The spectral concentration problem in Fourier analysis  refers to finding a time sequence of a given length whose discrete Fourier transform is maximally localized on a given frequency interval, as measured by the spectral concentration.

Spectral concentration

The discrete-time Fourier transform (DTFT) U(f) of a finite series ,  is defined as 

In the following, the sampling interval will be taken as Δt = 1, and hence the frequency interval as 
f ∈ [-½,½]. U(f) is a periodic function with a period 1.

For a given frequency W such that 0<W<½, the spectral concentration  of U(f) on the interval [-W,W] is defined as the ratio of power of U(f) contained in the frequency band [-W,W] to the power of U(f) contained in the entire frequency band [-½,½]. That is,

It can be shown that U(f) has only isolated zeros and hence  (see [1]).  Thus, the spectral concentration is strictly less than one, and there is no finite sequence  for which the DTFT can be confined to a band [-W,W] and made to vanish outside this band.

Statement of the problem

Among all sequences  for a given T and W, is there a sequence for which the spectral concentration is maximum? In other words, is there a sequence for which the sidelobe energy outside a frequency band [-W,W] is minimum?

The answer is yes; such a sequence indeed exists and can be found by optimizing . Thus maximising the power 

subject to the constraint that the total power is fixed, say 

leads to the following equation satisfied by the optimal sequence :

This is an eigenvalue equation for a symmetric matrix given by

It can be shown that this matrix is positive-definite, hence all the eigenvalues of
this matrix lie between 0 and 1.  The largest eigenvalue of the above equation corresponds to the largest possible spectral concentration; the corresponding eigenvector is the required optimal sequence . This sequence is called a 0th–order Slepian sequence (also known as a discrete prolate spheroidal sequence, or DPSS), which is a unique taper with maximally suppressed sidelobes.

It turns out that the number of dominant eigenvalues of the matrix M that are close to 1, corresponds to N=2WT called as Shannon number. This nth–order taper also offers the best sidelobe suppression and is pairwise orthogonal to the Slepian sequences of previous orders . These lower order Slepian sequences form
the basis for spectral estimation by multitaper method.

Not limited to time series, the spectral concentration problem can be reformulated to apply on the surface of the sphere by using spherical harmonics, for applications in geophysics and cosmology among others.

See also
Multitaper
Fourier transform
Discrete Fourier transform

References
 Partha Mitra and Hemant Bokil.  Observed Brain Dynamics, Oxford University Press, USA (2007), Link for book
 Donald. B. Percival and Andrew. T. Walden.  Spectral Analysis for Physical Applications: Multitaper and Conventional Univariate Techniques, Cambridge University Press, UK (2002).
 Partha Mitra and B. Pesaran, "Analysis of Dynamic Brain Imaging Data." The Biophysical Journal, Volume 76 (1999), 691-708, arxiv.org/abs/q-bio/0309028 
 F. J. Simons, M. A. Wieczorek and F. A. Dahlen. Spatiospectral concentration on a sphere. SIAM Review, 2006, 

Fourier analysis
Signal processing